Stenocheila is a genus of beetles in the family Carabidae, containing the following species:

 Stenocheila bicolor (Liebke, 1932)
 Stenocheila lacordairei Castelnau, 1832

References

Platyninae